is a former Japanese football player.

Club career
Ujiie was born in Tokyo on February 23, 1979. He played for Yokohama Flügels youth team until 1996. Through trainee for 1 season, he joined top team in 1998. Although he was originally forward, he was converted to defensive midfielder by manager Carles Rexach. However the club was disbanded end of 1998 season due to financial strain, he moved to J2 League club Omiya Ardija. he played as regular player as defensive midfielder. However his opportunity to play decreased from 2003. In 2005, he moved to Thespa Kusatsu was newly promoted to J2 League. However he left the club end of 2005 season, due to financial strain of the club. He joined Tonan SC Gunma (later Tonan Maebashi) in May 2006. He retired end of 2014 season.

National team career
In April 1999, he was selected Japan U-20 national team for 1999 World Youth Championship. At this tournament, he played 1 match in the final match instead of Shinji Ono was suspended. Japan won the 2nd place.

Club statistics

Honors and awards
 FIFA World Youth Championship Runner-up - 1999

References

External links

1979 births
Living people
Association football people from Tokyo
Japanese footballers
Japan youth international footballers
J1 League players
J2 League players
Yokohama Flügels players
Omiya Ardija players
Thespakusatsu Gunma players
Association football midfielders